Ächerli Pass (el. 1398 m.) is a high mountain pass between the cantons of Obwalden and Nidwalden.

It connects Kerns in the canton of Obwalden and Dallenwil in the canton of Nidwalden. The pass road has grades of up to 15 percent. From the road, peaks such as Pilatus, Rigi, Buochserhorn, Titlis, and Stanserhorn are visible.

See also
 List of highest paved roads in Europe
 List of mountain passes
List of the highest Swiss passes

References

Mountain passes of Obwalden
Mountain passes of Nidwalden
Mountain passes of Switzerland
Mountain passes of the Alps
Nidwalden–Obwalden border